I due pericoli pubblici ( Two Public Enemies) is a 1964 film directed by Lucio Fulci starring the comic duo Franco and Ciccio.

Plot
Franco and Ciccio Introlia are two scammers. One day they disguise themselves as NATO officers to try to collect a bribe for a conscription exemption
and unwittingly unleash a nuclear aerial retaliation.

Cast 
Franco Franchi - Franco Introlia
Ciccio Ingrassia - Ciccio Introlia
Margaret Lee - Floriana
Linda Sini - Dora
Riccardo Garrone- The Baron
Luciana Angiolillo - The Wife
Mino Doro - Giorgio's Father
Corrado Olmi
Ignazio Leone
Poldo Bendandi - The Left Handed
Gianni Dei
Salvo Libassi

Context 
The film is part of an informal trilogy (following I due evasi di Sing Sing and 00-2 agenti segretissimi) by the same filmmaker, released the same year and with the same two Sicilian comedians. It is considered a good entertaining comedy despite obvious flaws in the plot.

References

External links

1964 films
Films directed by Lucio Fulci
Italian comedy films
1964 comedy films
1960s Italian-language films
1960s Italian films